Bandits in Milan (also known as The Violent Four) is a 1968 Italian crime film directed by Carlo Lizzani. It was listed to compete at the 1968 Cannes Film Festival, but the festival was cancelled due to the events of May 1968 in France. It is the debut film of Agostina Belli.

Production
Like director Carlo Lizzani's previous film Wake Up and Die is based on a real life event, specifically a bank robbery that went wrong in Milan on 25 September 1967.

Cast
 Gian Maria Volonté as Piero Cavallero
 Tomas Milian as Commissario Basevi
 Don Backy as Sante Notarnicola
 Ray Lovelock as Donato 'Tuccio' Lopez
 Ezio Sancrotti as Adriano Rovoletto 'Bartolini'
 Piero Mazzarella as Piva
 Laura Solari as Tuccio's Mother
 Peter Martell as The Protector
 Margaret Lee as Prostitute
 Carla Gravina as Anna
 Luigi Rossetti as Robber
 María Rosa Sclauzero as Piero's Secretary
 Ida Meda as Moglie di Piero
 Tota Ruta as Club Hitman
 Evi Rossi Scotti
 Gianni Bortolotti
 Agostina Belli as Ragazza in ostaggio
 Pupo De Luca as Uomo della 1100

Release
Bandits in Milan was released on 30 March 1968. It grossed just over ₤1.768 million in Italy.
As of 2013, the film has never been released on home video.

Notes

References

External links

1968 films
1968 crime films
1960s Italian-language films
Films set in 1967
Films directed by Carlo Lizzani
Films set in Milan
Police detective films
Poliziotteschi films
Films scored by Riz Ortolani
Films produced by Dino De Laurentiis
1960s Italian films